The Patni community is a Scheduled Caste who are mainly found in the region of Barak Valley.

History 
Patni might be related to the Domba community of Assam and in some areas their names are used interchangeably. The main occupation of Patnis include ferrying boats, basket-making, trading and cultivating. According to Patnis folklore Ishwari Patni ferries Goddess Annapurna on his boat, also mentioned by Bharatchandra.

Patnis are also called Nadiyal and they mainly lived in Sylhet, Dacca, etc and migrated towards districts of Assam, West Bengal and Manipur.

Present Circumstances 
Total population of Patni community in Assam is around 1,36,661 which accounts for 8.2 percent of the Scheduled Caste population of state.

The Patnis are divided into five sub-castes:

 Jat-Patni, who are agriculturists and small traders.
 Ghat-Patni, Salami or Ghatwal who work as boatmen and take charge of ferries.
 Dom-Patni, Machhwa, or Nagarchi, who catcg fish, rear pigs, and work as musician.
 Sansphor and Dagara, who makes baskets of cane, and tie the framework of kancha houses.

During marriage bride-price is paid by the parents of the bridegroom, polygamy is recognized and women are not allowed to divorce or remarry.

Notable Patnis 

 Nibaran Chandra Laskar, member of the constituent assembly and former MP
 Nihar Ranjan Laskar, former MP from Assam

References 

Scheduled Castes of Assam